Catocala olgaorlovae is a moth of the family Erebidae first described by Vasiliy D. Kravchenko et al. in 2008. It is known only from the southern Levant where it was collected in two oases of the central Negev, En Avdat, En Ziq, and from the Egyptian central Sinai Peninsula near Santa Katharina.

Adults are on wing from August to September.

Subspecies
Catocala olgaorlovae olgaorlovae
Catocala olgaorlovae duschara Lewandowski & Tober, 2008 (Jordan)

References

olgaorlovae
Moths described in 2008
Moths of the Middle East